Colin Sephton (born 10 July 1945) is a British former sports shooter. He competed at the 1968 Summer Olympics and the 1972 Summer Olympics.

References

1945 births
Living people
British male sport shooters
Olympic shooters of Great Britain
Shooters at the 1968 Summer Olympics
Shooters at the 1972 Summer Olympics
People from Burscough
Sportspeople from Lancashire
20th-century British people